The Rules: Time-tested Secrets for Capturing the Heart of Mr. Right is a self-help book by Ellen Fein and Sherrie Schneider, originally published in 1995.

The book suggests rules that a woman should follow in order to attract and marry the man of her dreams; these rules include that a woman should be "easy to be with but hard to get". The underlying philosophy of The Rules is that women should not aggressively pursue men, but rather, should encourage the men to pursue them. A woman who follows The Rules is called a Rules Girl.

Reaction 
The book generated much discussion upon its release. Some audiences considered it useful and motivational, while others felt that it was outdated, anti-men and antifeminist, or a how-to guide that teaches women to play games that toy with men. Psychology lecturer and therapist Meg-John Barker claims that the emergence of seduction communities happened "almost as a direct response to this hard-to-get femininity". Others noted that Fein was an accountant and Schneider a freelance journalist without professional qualification in the subject matter. Fein married and divorced and has recently remarried. Schneider has been married for over 21 years. The authors admitted they were not professionals in an appearance on NBC's The Today Show.

They have countered the criticism regarding their credentials by citing the results of actually following The Rules, though there is no body of evidence to support this.

Subsequent books 

The book was followed by The Rules II, The Rules for Marriage, The Rules for Online Dating, and All the Rules. In The Rules II: More Rules to Live and Love By, published in 1997, Fein and Schneider proclaim, "If he doesn't call, he's not that interested. Period!" (p. 60). In 2001 the follow-up book The Rules for Marriage: Time-Tested Secrets for Making Your Marriage Work was released in the midst of Fein's legal separation from her husband to whom she had been married for sixteen years. Fein commented on her divorce by saying that she had "married the right man" for her at that stage in her life. Her argument was that after having written a best seller and raising two children, she and her husband discovered they were two different people from the young couple that fell in love. Fein married for the second time in 2008; she had followed The Rules to attract her second husband, with the exception that they dated for three years rather than two (as “The Rules II” advises) before becoming engaged.

 Be a "Creature Unlike Any Other"
 Don't Talk to a Man First (and Don't Ask Him to Dance)
 Don't Stare at Men or Talk Too Much
 Don't Meet Him Halfway or Go Dutch on a Date
 Don't Call Him and Rarely Return His Calls
 Always End Phone Calls First
 Don't Accept a Saturday Night Date after Wednesday
 Fill Up Your Time before the Date
 How to Act on Dates 1, 2, and 3
 How to Act on Dates 4 through Commitment Time
 Always End the Date First
 Stop Dating Him if He Doesn't Buy You a Romantic Gift for Your Birthday or Valentine's Day
 Don't See Him More than Once or Twice a Week
 No More than Casual Kissing on the First Date
 Don't Rush into Sex and Other Rules for Intimacy
 Don't Tell Him What to Do
 Let Him Take the Lead
 Don't Expect a Man to Change or Try to Change Him
 Don't Open Up Too Fast
 Be Honest but Mysterious
 Accentuate the Positive and Other Rules for Personal Ads
 Don't Live with a Man (or Leave Your Things in His Apartment)
 Don't Date a Married Man
 Slowly Involve Him in Your Family and Other Rules for Women with Children
 Practice, Practice, Practice! (or, Getting Good at The Rules)
 Even if You're Engaged or Married, You Still Need The Rules
 Do The Rules, Even when Your Friends and Parents Think It's Nuts
 Be Smart and Other Rules for Dating in High School
 Take Care of Yourself and Other Rules for Dating in College
 Next! and Other Rules for Dealing with Rejection
 Don't Discuss The Rules with Your Therapist
 Don't Break The Rules
 Do The Rules and You'll Live Happily Ever After!
 Love Only Those Who Love You
 Be Easy to Live With

References

1995 non-fiction books
Dating
Self-help books